Taiping Township is a township in Zhaodong, Suihua, Heilongjiang, China. , it has seven villages under its administration:
Taiping Village
Tonghe Village
Qinjian Village
Donghe Village
Qunli Village
Guangyuan Village
Qingfeng Village

References 

Township-level divisions of Heilongjiang
Zhaodong